Hancock County is a county in the U.S. state of West Virginia. As of the 2020 census, the population was 29,095. Its county seat is New Cumberland and its largest city is Weirton. The county was created from Brooke County in 1848 and named for John Hancock, first signer of the Declaration of Independence. Hancock County is the northernmost point in both West Virginia and, by some definitions, the Southern United States; being at the tip of the state's Northern Panhandle. Hancock County is part of the Weirton-Steubenville, WV-OH Metropolitan Statistical Area, which is also included in the Pittsburgh-New Castle-Weirton, PA-WV-OH Combined Statistical Area.

History
Hancock County was formed from Brooke County in 1848, some 15 years before West Virginia became a state. Both counties were once part of Ohio County, Virginia, which had been formed from the District of West Augusta in 1776. Hancock County has significant Revolutionary-period roots due to its location on the Ohio River south of Fort Pitt in Pittsburgh and north of Fort Henry in Wheeling.

Hancock County was the site of the infamous massacre of Iroquois leader Chief Logan's family in 1774, at Baker's Tavern across the Ohio River from the mouth of Yellow Creek. The event, known as the Yellow Creek massacre, sparked Lord Dunmore's War. Adam Poe had his famous fight with the Indian known as Big Foot at the mouth of Tomlinson Run in 1781. Historical markers commemorate both events. Significant Revolutionary War forts and blockhouses in Hancock County included Holliday's Cove Fort in downtown Weirton and Chapman's Blockhouse in New Cumberland.

In 1863, West Virginia's counties were divided into civil townships, with the intention of encouraging local government.  This proved impractical in the heavily rural state, and in 1872 the townships were converted into magisterial districts.  Hancock County was divided into four districts: Butler, Clay, Grant, and Poe.  Poe, the least populous district, was discontinued in the 1920s.

Geography
It is the smallest county in West Virginia by area, as well as one of the smallest in the United States. The highest point of elevation in Hancock County is approximately 1363 ft. and located about 1800 ft. ESE of Emmanuel Mission Church.

Major highways

Adjacent counties
Columbiana County, Ohio (northwest)
Beaver County, Pennsylvania (east)
Washington County, Pennsylvania (southeast)
Brooke County (south)
Jefferson County, Ohio (west)

Demographics

2000 census
As of the census of 2000, there were 32,667 people, 13,678 households, and 9,506 families living in the county.  The population density was 394 people per square mile (152/km2).  There were 14,728 housing units at an average density of 178 per square mile (69/km2).  The racial makeup of the county was 96.42% White, 2.30% Black or African American, 0.12% Native American, 0.35% Asian, 0.01% Pacific Islander, 0.12% from other races, and 0.69% from two or more races.  0.74% of the population were Hispanic or Latino of any race.

There were 13,678 households, out of which 26.40% had children under the age of 18 living with them, 54.70% were married couples living together, 10.70% had a female householder with no husband present, and 30.50% were non-families. 26.60% of all households were made up of individuals, and 12.50% had someone living alone who was 65 years of age or older.  The average household size was 2.36 and the average family size was 2.83.

In the county, the population was spread out, with 20.80% under the age of 18, 7.20% from 18 to 24, 27.10% from 25 to 44, 26.40% from 45 to 64, and 18.40% who were 65 years of age or older.  The median age was 42 years. For every 100 females there were 92.40 males.  For every 100 females age 18 and over, there were 89.40 males.

The median income for a household in the county was $33,759, and the median income for a family was $40,719. Males had a median income of $34,813 versus $19,100 for females. The per capita income for the county was $17,724.  About 9.00% of families and 11.10% of the population were below the poverty line, including 16.10% of those under age 18 and 7.10% of those age 65 or over.

2010 census
As of the 2010 United States census, there were 30,676 people, 13,297 households, and 8,732 families living in the county. The racial makeup of the county was 95.7% white, 2.3% black or African American, 0.3% Asian, 0.1% American Indian, 0.2% from other races, and 1.3% from two or more races. Those of Hispanic or Latino origin made up 1.0% of the population. In terms of ancestry, 21.1% were German, 18.7% were Irish, 15.6% were Italian, 12.5% were English, 8.0% were Polish, and 6.2% were American.

Of the 13,297 households, 26.6% had children under the age of 18 living with them, 48.9% were married couples living together, 12.2% had a female householder with no husband present, 34.3% were non-families, and 29.5% of all households were made up of individuals. The average household size was 2.29 and the average family size was 2.80. The median age was 45.3 years.

The median income for a household in the county was $38,565 and the median income for a family was $46,978. Males had a median income of $40,961 versus $28,915 for females. The per capita income for the county was $23,118. About 11.2% of families and 14.8% of the population were below the poverty line, including 23.2% of those under age 18 and 7.0% of those age 65 or over.

Government
Hancock County is governed by a three-member County Commission who each serve in rotating six-year terms. The terms are designed such that one seat is up for election in even years. The County Commission annually chooses its own president. The Hancock County Commissioners in 2015 are Joe Barnabei, Jeff Davis and Commission President Michael Swartzmiller.

In the West Virginia Circuit Courts, Hancock County is part of the First Family Court Circuit of West Virginia, which also includes Brooke and Ohio Counties. In West Virginia, Family Court Judges were first elected to six-year terms beginning in 2002 and were elected to eight-year terms beginning in 2008. The current judges of the First Family Court Circuit are the Hon. Joyce Chernenko and the Hon. William Sinclair, both of whom were elected to eight-year terms in November 2008. Additionally, Hancock County is part of the First Judicial Circuit of West Virginia, which again also includes Brooke and Ohio Counties. Circuit Judges are elected in non-partisan elections to eight-year terms. The current judges of the First Judicial Circuit are the Hon. Jason A. Cuomo, the Hon. James Mazzone, the Hon. David J. Sims, and the Hon. Ronald E. Wilson.

Magistrates are elected in partisan elections serving four-year terms. Vacancies occurring in unexpired terms can be filled by a respective Circuit Court Judge. Unlike Circuit Court judges or Family Court judges, magistrates are not required to be attorneys. Hancock County currently has three magistrates: Mike White, William S. Hicks and Michael Powell.

Other elected officials are Sheriff Ralph Fletcher, Circuit Clerk Brenda Jackson, County Clerk George Foley, Assessor Joe Alongi and Prosecuting Attorney James Davis.

Politics
Abutting the free states of Ohio and Pennsylvania, and with a largely German–American culture unlike any other part of antebellum Virginia, Hancock County and the rest of the Northern Panhandle were central to the vanguard who made West Virginia a new state during the Civil War. For the next six and a half decades the county, aided by its association with Pennsylvania's powerful ironmonger-led political machines, voted solidly Republican to the point of supporting William Howard Taft during the disastrously divided 1912 election. From the New Deal until the presidency of Bill Clinton, however, powerful unionization meant that Hancock County turned from solidly Republican to solidly Democratic, with the exception of George McGovern in 1972. Like all of West Virginia, since 2000 a combination of declining unionization and growing differences with the Democratic Party on social issues has produced a swing back to the Republican Party.

Communities

Cities
Chester
New Cumberland (county seat)
Weirton (part)

Magisterial districts
Butler
Clay
Grant

Census-designated place
Newell

Unincorporated communities

Congo
Fairhaven
Kings Creek
Lawrenceville
Lennyville
Moscow
New Manchester
Sun Valley
Vermont Terrace

Population ranking
The population ranking of the following table is based on the 2020 census of Hancock County.

† county seat

See also
 Hillcrest Wildlife Management Area
 National Register of Historic Places listings in Hancock County, West Virginia
 Ohio River Trail
 Tomlinson Run State Park

References

External links
Hancock County government official website
Top of WV CVB, the Convention & Visitors Bureau for Brooke and Hancock Counties and the City of Weirton
WVGenWeb Hancock County
Hancock County Economic Development Homepage

 
West Virginia counties on the Ohio River
Counties of Appalachia
1848 establishments in Virginia